The Danhostel Copenhagen City is a hostel situated next to Langebro Bridge in central Copenhagen, Denmark. It is one of the largest European hostels, the biggest in a metropolitan area.

History 
The building was originally called Hotel Europa. It was the first high-rise tower in Copenhagen and was originally intended to be coupled with a never-built tower on the other side of the bridge. It was the tallest building of Denmark from 1955 to 1958, when it was surpassed by the Falkoner Center.
The building was later renovated and in 2004 was re-opened as a hostel.

Its interior furniture was designed by the Danish firm Gubi recalling with its colors Denmark's traditional housing style.

Facilities
The hostel has 1020 beds in dormitories or smaller rooms. Its basement hosts kitchen facilities while in the ground floor is located an Internet café.

Cultural references
Two gangsters are having a conversation on the roof of what was then called Hotel Europa at 0:59:52 in the 1969 Olsen-banden film The Olsen Gang in a Fix.

See also
 List of tallest buildings in Denmark

References

Hotels in Copenhagen
Hotels established in 1955
Hotel buildings completed in 1955
Skyscrapers in Denmark
Youth hostelling
Skyscraper hotels
1955 establishments in Denmark